Debora Ballarini (born 27 July 1987) is an Italian rugby union player who plays as a hooker for Rugby Riviera 1975 ASD and the Italy women's national rugby union team.

Sporting career
Ballarini previously played for the Pesaro Mustangs when she was called up to the Italy women's national rugby union team for the 2012 Women's Six Nations Championship, and continued to play for them during the following season. By 2015, she had transferred to Rugby Riviera 1975 ASD.

In 2018, Ballarini was involved in promoting and supporting a charity running event along with several other sportswomen, to support work to prevent violence against women.

References

Living people
1987 births
Italian female rugby union players